La Voix d'un ange (meaning The Voice of an Angel) is the name of the second studio album recorded by the French singer Grégory Lemarchal. It was released on 18 June 2007, about one month and a half after the singer's death. The album contains the hit singles "De temps en temps", "Le Lien" and "Restons amis". It was very successful in France, in Belgium (Wallonia) (#1 in both countries) and Switzerland.

The album is composed of Lemarchal's unpublished songs and several cover versions performed when he participated in the Star Academy 4.

Track listing
 "De temps en temps" (Davide Esposito, Grégory Lemarchal) — 3:54
 "Restons amis" (Esposito, Rémi Lacroix, Isabelle Bernal) — 3:43
 "Le lien"  (Patrick Fiori, Julie Zenatti) — 3:32
 "Recevoir" (Alexandre Lessertisseur, R. Jericho, V. Filho) — 4:18
 "Con te partirò" (Pierre Jaconelli, Julie D'Aimé) — 4:28
 "Là-bas" (Jean-Jacques Goldman) — 4:28
 "Envole-moi" (Goldman) — 4:10
 "S.O.S. d'un terrien en détresse" (Michel Berger, Luc Plamondon) — 4:23
 "The Show Must Go On" (Freddie Mercury, Brian May, Roger Taylor, John Deacon) — 3:56
 "Même si"  featuring Lucie Silvas (Lucie Silvas, Peter Gordeno, Mike Peden) — 3:57
 "Et maintenant" (Pierre Delanoë, Gilbert Bécaud) — 4:16

Charts

Certifications

References

2007 albums
Grégory Lemarchal albums
Albums published posthumously